Lofton Russell Henderson (May 24, 1903 – June 4, 1942) was a United States Marine Corps aviator during World War II.  He commanded Marine Scout Bombing Squadron 241 (VMSB-241) at the Battle of Midway and died while leading his squadron in an attack against Japanese aircraft carriers.

Biography

Early years
Lofton Henderson was born on May 24, 1903, in Lorain, Ohio. He attended Lorain High School and was captain of the football team. He graduated from the United States Naval Academy in 1926 along with Carlton Hutchins, Max Leslie, and C. Wade McClusky.

Early Marine Corps career
Henderson departed the United States on November 3, 1927 from San Francisco, California and arrived at Chingwangtao, China on December 16, 1927.  He was assigned as a platoon commander with the 15th Machine Gun and Howitzer Company, 12th Regiment, 3rd Brigade at Tientsin.  After passing a flight physical while in China, he received orders to report to Observation Squadron 8 (VO-8M) in San Diego, California.  He departed China on July 28, 1928 onboard the USS Chaumont (AP-5) arriving in San Francisco on August 17, 1928.

He also served in various Caribbean stations, and on the aircraft carriers Langley (CV-1), Ranger (CV-4), and Saratoga (CV-3).

World War II
On June 4, 1942, as Japanese forces approached Midway Island in the Pacific Ocean, Major Henderson, the commanding officer of VMSB-241, led 16 Marine Corps aircraft in the attack. Henderson split his squadron into two flights, one with SBD Dauntless and one with SB2U Vindicator dive bombers in a glide bombing attack on the aircraft carrier Hiryū. His left wing burst into flames as he began his final approach. Henderson continued the attack and perished as his plane dived toward the enemy carrier. He was posthumously awarded the Navy Cross.

Honors

Navy Cross citation
HENDERSON, LOFTON R.
Major, U.S. Marine Corps
Marine Scout-Bombing Squadron 241 (VMSB-241), Marine Aircraft Group 22 (MAG-22), Naval Air Station, Midway
Date of Action: June 4, 1942
Citation:
The Navy Cross is presented to Lofton R. Henderson, Major, U.S. Marine Corps, for extraordinary heroism as Squadron Commander of Marine Scout-Bombing Squadron TWO HUNDRED FORTY-ONE (VMSB- 241), during action against enemy Japanese forces in the Battle of Midway on June 4, 1942. With utter disregard for his own personal safety, Major Henderson, with keen judgment and courageous aggressiveness in the face of strong enemy fighter opposition, led his squadron in an attack which contributed materially to the defeat of the enemy. He was subsequently reported as missing in action. It is believed he gallantly gave up his life in the service of his country.

Legacy
In August 1942, the partially constructed Japanese airfield on Guadalcanal was captured at the outset of a six-month campaign to expel the enemy from both Guadalcanal and nearby and smaller Tulagi. It was named Henderson Field (now Honiara International Airport) in his honor.

Another Henderson Field (IATA: MDY, ICAO: PMDY) is today a public airport on Sand Island in Midway Atoll, an unincorporated territory of the United States. The airport is used as an emergency diversion point for ETOPS operations.  The airfield provides access to Midway Atoll National Wildlife Refuge. It operated until 1993 as Naval Air Facility Midway.  The original Henderson Field was on Eastern Island (Midway Atoll).

The 21st Street Bridge in his hometown of Lorain, Ohio, was renamed the Lofton Henderson Memorial Bridge.

See also

Citations

Bibliography

External links

1903 births
1942 deaths
United States Marine Corps personnel killed in World War II
Aviators from Ohio
Aviators killed by being shot down
Battle of Midway
Military personnel from Ohio
People from Lorain, Ohio
Recipients of the Navy Cross (United States)
United States Marine Corps officers
United States Marine Corps pilots of World War II
United States Naval Academy alumni